Adrijana Knežević (Serbian Cyrillic: Адријана Кнежевић; born 20 January 1987) is a Serbian professional basketball player for  of La Liga Feminina.

External links
Profile at website of FIBA Europe
Profile at eurobasket.com

1987 births
Living people
People from Senta
Small forwards
Serbian expatriate basketball people in France
Serbian expatriate basketball people in Italy
Serbian expatriate basketball people in Spain
Serbian expatriate basketball people in Poland
Serbian women's basketball players
ŽKK Šumadija Kragujevac players
ŽKK Spartak Subotica players